The National Committee for Quality Assurance (NCQA) is an independent 501(c)(3) nonprofit organization in the United States that works to improve health care quality through the administration of evidence-based standards, measures, programs, and accreditation. The National Committee for Quality Assurance operates on a formula of measure, analyze, and improve and it aims to build consensus across the industry by working with policymakers, employers, doctors, and patients, as well as health plans.

History
The National Committee for Quality Assurance was established in 1990 with support from the Robert Wood Johnson Foundation.

Programs
The National Committee for Quality Assurance manages voluntary accreditation programs for individual physicians, health plans, and medical groups. It offers dedicated programs targeting vendor certification, software certification, and compliance auditing. 
Health plans seek accreditation and measure performance through the administration and submission of the Healthcare Effectiveness Data and Information Set (HEDIS) and Consumer Assessment of Healthcare Providers and Systems (CAHPS) survey. The National Committee for Quality Assurance provides an evidence-based program for case-management accreditation available for uses in payer, provider, and community-based organizations.

References

External links
 

Medical regulation in the United States
Healthcare accreditation organizations in the United States